Giovanni Rustenberg better known by his stage name Cho (born in Amsterdam on 6 February 1993) is a Dutch rapper. He was part of the hip hop collective SlodderVosGang and Straight Outta Control before going solo.

SlodderVosGang was a collective started by Cho, Adje, Reverse and Jayh. Jowy Rose joined in 2014. They released the mini album S.V.G. and the single "Zeg me". While in SlodderVosGang, Cho pushed his career with two mixtapes Knock Knock in 2012 and Knock Knock 2 in 2013. He also appeared as a guest on albums by Reverse, Broederliefde and Keizer.

Straight Outta Control was a hip hop formation that included besides Cho, the artists Big2, Adje, Dio, Hef and MocroManiac. In 2015, they released the EP S.O.C. / Straight Outta Control and they had the hit "Dat nu".

As solo rapper, Cho has released three albums all making to the Dutch Albums Top 5, Knock Knock III in 2016, Since '93 in 2019 and Chosen in 2021.

In 2016, his collaboration with Stefflon Don and record producer Spanker in the single "Popalik" earned him the Britse Urban Music Awards.

Personal life
His older brother Randy Rustenberg was a former professional football player in the Netherlands.

Discography

Albums

Collaborative albums

As part of SlodderVosGang
2014: S.V.G. (a mini album)

As part of Straight Outta Control
2015: S.O.C. / Straight Outta Control  (an EP)

Mixtapes

Singles
as part of SlodderVosGang
2014: "Zeg me"

as part of Straight Outta Control 
2015: "Dat nu"

solo

Featured in

Other songs

References

Dutch rappers
1993 births
Living people
Musicians from Amsterdam
21st-century Dutch musicians